Fadi Merza (born 8 March 1978 in Derbassiah, Syria) is a retired Syrian born Austrian-Assyrian middleweight kickboxer. Merza was a multiple world kickboxing and Muay Thai champion.

Biography and career

Early years
Fadi Merza was born in Derbassiah, Syria to an Assyrian family. Fadi was ten years old, when he and his family left his native Syria and moved to Vienna. "My parents just wanted to provide us a secure future. Within just six months, I had mastered the German language", said Merza in a 2012 interview. At the age of 16, Fadi started training kickboxing. After fighting as an amateur in the kickboxing circuit, he switched to Muay Thai. He was awarded his first title at age 18, when he won the WPKL Junior World Super Welterweight Championship during an event near Vienna, Austria on November 15, 1997.

Having become a youth champion, Merza was given the chance in 2000 to fight for the World Muay Thai Middleweight Championship of the World Professional Kickboxing Council (WPKC), one of the minor sanctioning organizations in the world. Fadi decisioned his opponent to win his second World title. In May 2001, the European Thaiboxing Championship of the more prestigious WKA was at stake. He faced off against the routined Brit Eugene Valerio at the first Vienna Fight Night. Valerio was troubled by Fadi’s accurate knee strikes, suffering a cut above his eye. A well placed kick to the midsection finally proved to be the Brit’s downfall, by breaking his forearm. Fadi won via TKO in the second round.

A year later, again in Vienna, Fadi challenged Mohammed Ouali for the vacant WKA Thaiboxing World Middleweight title. The fight went to the distance after five grueling rounds. In front of his hometown crowd Fadi lost a close decision. Despite his defeat he was signed by Austrian businessman Marcus Bauer for his kickboxing organization SuperLeague.

Fighting for SuperLeague

Merza made his debut in SuperLeague at the kick off show in Vienna in May 2003. Fadi showed a dominant performance against Takahiko Shimizu from Japan. At his second SuperLeague appearance, in Wuppertal, Germany, he faced off against another Japanese fighter, Akeomi Nitta. Fadi dominated the first two rounds, but the fight soon turned into a tough battle. After five hard rounds, Merza got a decision victory.

In January 2004, Merza challenged Kamal El Amrani for his IKBO World Middleweight Championship belt. In front of a sold-out crowd, again going to distance in a spectacular fight, Fadi lost a close decision against his well-known Moroccan adversary. Fadi Merza claimed the number three spot in the official SuperLeague middleweight rankings with victories over Peter Crook, Jose Reis, Petr Polak and  Malaipet Sasiprapa and losing only his fights against Ole Laursen, Sahin Yakut and John Wayne Parr. Ending his successful SuperLeague career, Fadi faced Alviar Lima for the vacant SuperLeague Middleweight belt, losing a close decision. His fight against Lima is still considered by many fight fans as the best bout in SuperLeague history.

King's Cup participation

Merza was able to return to the winner's column in impressive fashion by knocking out Ümüt Demirörüs and Rico Recineu, in one night to win the King’s Cup qualifier tournament in Switzerland in September 2009. Fadi earned himself a spot in the King's Cup, the most prestigious and biggest Muay Thai tournament in the world, which is held once a year in Bangkok, Thailand. Cheered on by over 150,000 spectators, Merza defeated his quarter final opponent, Enriko Kehl from Germany. Kehl hit the canvas twice, after being hit with hard elbows and knees, giving Merza the well deserved decision victory. Unfortunately, Fadi had to withdraw from the tournament due to a ruptured ear drum, as well as a cut over his right eye, forcing the ring-side doctor to not give his consent for another fight.

World title success

After fighting for SuperLeague, Merza had regular appearances in international promotions all over the world. Merza was given the chance to fight for a world title again on February 7, 2010, taking on Luca D’Isanto for the ISKA Oriental Light Middleweight Championship. Staged at the Wiener Stadium in the centre of Vienna, Merza hurt Di Santo in the first round with a knee to the head. The Italian took an eight count but wasn’t ready to give up. Merza had to earn the title winning a clear unanimous decision. Before the year was done, he added one more world title to his mantlepiece, outpointing Bachir Maroun in Munich, Germany on August 25, 2010 to take the WKA K-1 rules World Super Welterweight belt.

On January 22, 2011, Fadi faced Joakim Karlsson in Vienna, Austria. A rematch as Karlsson defeated him in their first encounter. He decisioned the Swede over five rounds for the WKA K-1 rules World Middleweight title. Merza made an impressive six successful title defenses during his reign as champion. For his first defense, he chose to fight Dan Balsemao from Portugal in a rematch. Balsemao had performed well in their first encounter, winning the fight on points. However, this time Merza bested the Portuguese over five rounds to defend the belt.

Fadi's next title defense pitted him against Darko Delic. The kickboxer from Bosnia and Herzegovina was not regarded as a top contender and it took Merza only two rounds to end the fight. His next defense was against a much tougher opponent. In September 2012, he faced the highly regarded Dane Mohammed El Mir. Merza proved that he still belonged on the world stage when he defeated El Mir on points. In his sixth defense, Fadi was challenged by Jason Woodham, a WMC MAD champion from England. Merza dominated the fight from start to finish. In the first round, the Brit went to the canvas. Clearly not having recovered, Manhood went down again in the second round after a two right hooks and a left jab combination. The referee intervened and stopped the fight.

On May 4, 2012, Merza eventually lost his WKA K-1 rules World Middleweight title in his seventh title defense. After five rounds, almost everyone at ringside saw it as a draw. However, the fight went in favor of Fadi's opponent Fernando Calzetta, who was awarded a points win.

Doping suspension
In 2013, Merza was suspended by the OPBU for 2 years for his refusal to submit a sample at Multiversum in Schwechat, Austria on 4 May 2013.

Personal life

Fadi Merza is married to his longtime girlfriend Ines.

Titles
2012 OPBU K-1 rules World Middleweight Championship
2011 WKA K-1 rules World Middleweight Championship (6 title defenses)
2010 WKA K-1 rules World Super Welterweight Championship
2010 ISKA Oriental World Light Middleweight Championship
2009 WMC King's Cup Challenge Tournament Champion
2001 WKA Thaiboxing European Middleweight Championship
2000 WPKC Muay Thai Middleweight Championship
1997 World Professional Kickboxing League (WPKL) Junior World Super Welterweight Championship

Kickboxing record

|-
|-  bgcolor="#CCFFCC"
| 2014-12-06 || Win ||align=left| Gianfranco Capurso || FFC 16: Vienna || Vienna, Austria || TKO || 1 || 1:45
|-
! style=background:white colspan=9 |
|-
|-  bgcolor="#FFBBBB"
| 2014-05-24 || Loss ||align=left| Foad Sadeghi || Vienna Fight Night || Vienna, Austria || Decision  || 5 || 3:00
|-
|-  bgcolor="#CCFFCC"
| 2014-02-22 || Win ||align=left| Alex Gallone || Vienna Fight Night || Vienna, Austria || KO || 2 || 
|-
|-  bgcolor="#FFBBBB"
| 2013-05-04 || Loss ||align=left| Fernando Calzetta || Multiversum || Schwechat, Austria || Decision || 5 || 3:00  
|-
! style=background:white colspan=9 |
|-
|-  bgcolor="#CCFFCC"
| 2013-02-23 || Win ||align=left| Ivan Tosković || Vienna Fight Night || Vienna, Austria || KO || 1 || 0:55
|-
|-  bgcolor="#CCFFCC"
| 2012-12-08 || Win ||align=left| Jason Woodham || Vendetta VI || Vienna, Austria || KO || 2 || 
|-
! style=background:white colspan=9 |
|-
|-  bgcolor="#CCFFCC"
| 2012-09-29 || Win ||align=left| Mohamed El-Mir || Vienna Fight Night || Vienna, Austria || Decision || 5 || 3:00
|-
! style=background:white colspan=9 |
|-
|-  bgcolor="#CCFFCC"
| 2012-06-30 || Win ||align=left| Darko Delic || Multiversum || Schwechat, Austria || TKO || 2 || 
|-
! style=background:white colspan=9 |
|-
|-  bgcolor="#CCFFCC"
| 2012-05-16 || Win ||align=left| Dan Balsemao || Vienna Fight Night || Vienna, Austria || Decision  || 5 || 3:00
|-
! style=background:white colspan=9 |
|-
|-  bgcolor="#FFBBBB"
| 2012-04-29 || Loss ||align=left| Mike Zambidis ||Iron Challenge || Athens, Greece || Decision (Unanimous) || 3 || 3:00
|-
|-  bgcolor="#FFBBBB"
| 2012-03 || Win ||align=left| Dan Balsemao ||  || Vienna, Austria || Decision  || 3 || 3:00
|-
|-  bgcolor="#FFBBBB"
| 2012-02-17 || Loss ||align=left| Yoshihiro Sato || Krush Vol. 16 || Tokyo, Japan || Decision (Unanimous)|| 5 || 3:00 
|-
! style=background:white colspan=9 |
|-
|-  bgcolor="#CCFFCC"
| 2011-04-30 || Win ||align=left| Imre Gyarmati || Premium Fight Night || Vienna, Austria || KO || 1 ||  
|-
|-  bgcolor="#FFBBBB"
| 2011|| Loss ||align=left| Cedric Muller || The Challenger Muaythai || Kuala Lumpur, Malaysia || Decision (Unanimous) || 3 || 3:00
|-
|-  bgcolor="#FFBBBB"
| 2011-04-09 || Loss ||align=left| Ali Gunyar || A1 World Combat Cup || Eindhoven, Netherlands || Decision (Unanimous) || 3 || 3:00
|-
! style=background:white colspan=9 |
|-
|-  bgcolor="#CCFFCC"
| 2011-02-25 || Win ||align=left| Ogün Sesli ||  || Dubai, United Arab Emirates || Decision || 3 || 3:00 
|-
|-  bgcolor="#CCFFCC"
| 2011-02-05 || Win ||align=left| Michal Halada || Nitrianska Noc Bojovnikov 3 || Nitra, Slovakia || Decision (Unanimous) || 3 || 3:00  
|-
|-  bgcolor="#CCFFCC"
| 2011-01-22 || Win ||align=left| Joakim Karlsson || X-3 League Austria vs Russia || Vienna, Austria || Decision|| 5 || 3:00 
|-
! style=background:white colspan=9 |
|-
|-  bgcolor="#CCFFCC"
| 2010-12-04 || Win ||align=left| Istvan Szucs || Ultimate Cage Fighters || Vienna, Austria || KO || 1 ||  
|-
|-  bgcolor="#CCFFCC"
| 2010-09-25 || Win ||align=left| Alessandro Iacono || Die Nacht der 8|| Vienna, Austria || Decision (Unanimous) || 3 || 3:00 
|-
|-  bgcolor="#CCFFCC"
| 2010-08-25 || Win ||align=left| Bachir Maroun || Stekos Fight Night || Munich, Germany || Decision|| 5 || 3:00 
|-
! style=background:white colspan=9 |
|-
|-  bgcolor="#c5d2ea"
| 2010-06-05 || Draw ||align=left| Anthony Kane || Vienna Fight Night || Vienna, Austria || Decision draw || 3 || 3:00
|-
|-  bgcolor="#CCFFCC"
| 2010-05-08 || Win ||align=left| Krisztian Jaszka || Ultimate Cage Fighters 3 || Vienna, Austria || TKO || 3 || 
|-
|-  bgcolor="#FFBBBB"
| 2010-04-03 || Loss ||align=left| Baker Barakat || S-8 Thaiboxing || Wuppertal, Germany || Decision || 3 || 3:00
|-
|-  bgcolor="#FFBBBB"
| 2010-03-21 || Loss ||align=left| Vladimír Moravčík || Gala Night Zilina 2010 || Zilina, Slovakia || Decision || 3 || 3:00
|-
|-  bgcolor="#CCFFCC"
| 2010-03-06 || Win ||align=left| Fabrice Riconneau || || Vienna, Austria || KO ||  || 
|-
|-  bgcolor="#CCFFCC"
| 2010-02-07 || Win ||align=left| Luca D’Isanto || || Vienna, Austria || Decision (Unanimous)|| 5 || 3:00 
|-
! style=background:white colspan=9 |
|-
|-  bgcolor="#CCFFCC"
| 2009-12-05 || Win ||align=left| Enriko Kehl || King's Cup, Quarter Final || Bangkok, Thailand || Decision || 3 || 3:00 
|-
|-
! style=background:white colspan=9 |
|-
|-  bgcolor="#FFBBBB"
| 2009-10-31 || Loss ||align=left| Alviar Lima || KlasH European Elimination || Martigny, Switzerland || Decision (Unanimous)|| 5 || 3:00
|-
|-  bgcolor="#FFBBBB"
| 2009-09-26 || Loss ||align=left| Tobias Alexandersson || Battle of Sweden 2 || Stockholm, Sweden || Decision (Unanimous)|| 5 || 3:00
|-
|-  bgcolor="#CCFFCC"
| 2009-09-19 || Win ||align=left| Rico Recineu || King's Cup Challenge, Final || Arosa, Switzerland || KO || 1 ||  
|-
! style=background:white colspan=9 |
|-
|-  bgcolor="#CCFFCC"
| 2009-09-19 || Win ||align=left| Ümüt Demirörüs || King's Cup Challenge, Semi Final || Arosa, Switzerland || KO || 1 ||  
|-
|-  bgcolor="#FFBBBB"
| 2009-03-28 || Loss ||align=left| Joakim Karlsson || Battle of Sweden 1 || Stockholm, Sweden || Decision (Split)|| 3 || 3:00
|-
|-  bgcolor="#CCFFCC"
| 2009-02 || Win ||align=left| Odje Manda || We are Back || Vienna, Austria || Decision || 3 || 3:00 
|-
|-  bgcolor="#CCFFCC"
| 2009-01-17 || Win ||align=left| Razadek Filip || Muay Thai Europe vs Thailande || Strasbourg, France || KO || 4 || 
|-
|-  bgcolor="#CCFFCC"
| 2008-10-19 || Win ||align=left| Laurent Sachs || Lords of the Ring|| Vienna, Austria || Decision (Unanimous) || 3 || 3:00
|-
|-  bgcolor="#CCFFCC"
| 2008-08-08 || Win ||align=left| Muhammed Gür || Swiss Las Vegas 3 || Basel, Switzerland || Decision (Unanimous) || 3 || 3:00
|-
|-  bgcolor="#CCFFCC"
| 2008-04-20 || Win ||align=left| Vasily Shish || Vienna Fight Night || Vienna, Austria || Decision || 3 || 3:00
|-
|-  bgcolor="#FFBBBB"
| 2008-03-03 || Loss ||align=left| Naruepol Fairtex || SLAMM "Nederland vs Thailand IV" || Almere, Netherlands || TKO (Corner stoppage) || 4 || 0:00
|-
|-  bgcolor="#CCFFCC"
| 2008-01-27 || Win ||align=left| Mark Vogel ||  || Vienna, Austria || Decision (Unanimous) || 3 || 3:00
|-
|-  bgcolor="#CCFFCC"
| 2007-12-15 || Win ||align=left| Bartosz Koscielniak || Swiss Las Vegas 2 || Basel, Switzerland || Decision (Unanimous) || 3 || 3:00
|-
|-  bgcolor="#FFBBBB"
| 2007-11-24 || Loss ||align=left| Abdallah Mabel || Janus Fight Night 2007, Quarter Final || Padova, Italy || TKO || 2 || 
|-
|-  bgcolor="#FFBBBB"
| 2007-10-27 || Loss ||align=left| Samranchai 96 Penang || One Night in Bangkok || Antwerp, Belgium || Decision (Unanimous) || 5 || 3:00 
|-
|-  bgcolor="#CCFFCC"
| 2007-07-21 || Win ||align=left| Olli Koch || KlasH II || Albufeira, Portugal || Decision || 3 || 3:00 
|-
|-  bgcolor="#CCFFCC"
| 2007-06-16 || Win ||align=left| Yousef Akhnikh || Vienna Fight Night || Vienna, Austria || Decision || 5 || 3:00 
|-
|-  bgcolor="#CCFFCC"
| 2007-05-12 || Win ||align=left| Omar Amrami || Swiss Las Vegas 1 || Basel, Switzerland || Decision || 3 || 3:00 
|-
|-  bgcolor="#CCFFCC"
| 2007-03-03 || Win ||align=left| ||  || Vienna, Austria || KO ||  ||  
|-
|-  bgcolor="#FFBBBB"
| 2006-05-13 || Loss ||align=left| Alviar Lima || SuperLeague Elimination 2006 || Vienna, Austria || Decision || 3 || 3:00
|-
|-
! style=background:white colspan=9 |
|-
|-  bgcolor="#FFBBBB"
| 2006-03-11 || Loss ||align=left| Şahin Yakut || SuperLeague Apocalypse 2006 || Paris, France || Decision || 3 || 3:00
|-
|-  bgcolor="#CCFFCC"
| 2006-01-28 || Win ||align=left| Jose Reis || SuperLeague Hungary 2006 || Budapest, Hungary || Decision || 5 || 3:00 
|-
|-  bgcolor="#CCFFCC"
| 2005-11-19 || Win ||align=left| Florin Vintilă || SuperLeague Portugal 2005 || Portugal || KO || 2 || 
|-
|-  bgcolor="#CCFFCC"
| 2005-10-22 || Win ||align=left| Petr Polak || SuperLeague Austria 2005 || Vienna, Austria || Decision || 5 || 3:00
|-
|-  bgcolor="#FFBBBB"
| 2005-09-24 || Loss ||align=left| Kamal El Amrani || SuperLeague Turkey 2005 || Istanbul, Turkey || Decision || 3 || 3:00
|-
|-  bgcolor="#CCFFCC"
| 2005-09-24 || Win ||align=left| Malaipet Sasiprapa || SuperLeague Turkey 2005 || Istanbul, Turkey || Decision || 3 || 3:00
|-
|-  bgcolor="#CCFFCC"
| 2005-05-21 || Win ||align=left| Peter Crooke || SuperLeague Germany 2005 || Germany || Decision || 5 || 3:00
|-
|-  bgcolor="#FFBBBB"
| 2005-04-09 || Loss ||align=left| Şahin Yakut || SuperLeague Austria 2005 || Vienna, Austria || Decision || 5 || 3:00
|-
|-  bgcolor="#FFBBBB"
| 2004-11-14 || Loss ||align=left| Ray Staring || Vienna Fight Night || Vienna, Austria || Decision || 5 || 3:00
|-
! style=background:white colspan=9 |
|-
|-  bgcolor="#CCFFCC"
| 2004-10-23 || Win ||align=left| Thomas Hladky || SuperLeague Germany 2004 || Germany || Decision || 5 || 3:00
|-
|-  bgcolor="#FFBBBB"
| 2004-05-22 || Loss ||align=left|  Ole Laursen || SuperLeague Switzerland 2004 || Winterfuhr, Switzerland || Decision || 5 || 3:00
|-
|-  style="background:#fbb;"
| 2004-03-20 || Loss ||align=left| John Wayne Parr || SuperLeague Italy 2004 || Padova, Veneto, Italy || Decision (Unanimous) || 5 || 3:00
|-
|-  style="background:#fbb;"
| 2004-01-25 || Loss ||align=left| Kamal El Amrani || Vienna Fight Night || Vienna, Austria || Decision || 5 || 3:00
|-
! style=background:white colspan=9 |
|-
|-  bgcolor="#FFBBBB"
| 2003-12-06 || Loss ||align=left| Ole Laursen || SuperLeague Netherlands 2003 || Germany || Decision || 5 || 3:00
|-
|-  bgcolor="#CCFFCC"
| 2003-09-27 || Win ||align=left| Akeomi Nitta || SuperLeague Germany 2003 || Germany || Decision || 5 || 3:00
|-
|-  bgcolor="#CCFFCC"
| 2003-05-10 || Win ||align=left| Takahiko Shimizu || SuperLeague Austria 2003 || Vienna, Austria || Decision || 5 || 3:00
|-
|-  bgcolor="#CCFFCC"
| 2002-10-27 || Win ||align=left| Bjorn Marien || Vienna Fight Night || Vienna, Austria || Decision || 5 || 3:00
|-
|-  bgcolor="#FFBBBB"
| 2002-09-08 || Loss ||align=left| Nadir Lareche || The Fighting Party || Rotterdam, Netherlands || KO || 5 || 
|-
|-  bgcolor="#FFBBBB"
| 2002-05-24 || Loss ||align=left| Mohammed Ouali || Vienna Fight Night || Vienna, Austria || Decision (Split) || 5 || 3:00
|-
! style=background:white colspan=9 |
|-
|-  bgcolor="#CCFFCC"
| 2001-05 || Win ||align=left| Eugene Valerio || Vienna Fight Night || Vienna, Austria || TKO (Referee stoppage) || 2 || 
|-
! style=background:white colspan=9 |
|-
|-  bgcolor="#CCFFCC"
| 2000 || Win ||align=left| ||  || Vienna, Austria ||  ||  || 
|-
! style=background:white colspan=9 |
|-
|-  bgcolor="#FFBBBB"
| 2000-01-26 || Loss ||align=left| Vasily Shish ||  || Vienna, Austria || KO ||  || 
|-
|-  bgcolor="#CCFFCC"
| 1997-11-15 || Win ||align=left|  || ||Austria ||  ||  || 
|-
! style=background:white colspan=9 |
|-
|-  bgcolor="#FFBBBB"
| 1996 || Loss ||align=left| Abdel Bchiri ||  || Rabat, Morocco || Decision  ||  || 
|-
|-
|-
| colspan=9 | Legend:

References

1976 births
Living people
Austrian male kickboxers
Middleweight kickboxers
Assyrian sportspeople
Austrian Muay Thai practitioners
Austrian people of Syrian descent
Syrian male kickboxers
Doping cases in kickboxing